Carrington School is a coeducational secondary school located in Redhill, Surrey, England.

Previously a community school administered by Surrey County Council, in January 2017 The Warwick School converted to academy status. The school is now sponsored by the South East Surrey Schools Education Trust. In September 2021, the school changed its name from The Warwick School to Carrington School.

Notable former pupils 
 Henry Golding, actor, former presenter on BBC's The Travel Show (TV series)

References

External links
School website

Reigate and Banstead
Academies in Surrey
Secondary schools in Surrey